A quadrilateral, in geometry, is a polygon with 4 sides.

Quadrilateral may also refer to:
 Complete quadrilateral, in projective geometry, a configuration with 4 lines and 6 points
 Chicago-Lambeth Quadrilateral, a four-point statement of fundamental doctrine, in the Anglican Communion
 Wesleyan Quadrilateral, the four sources of doctrine in the Methodist Church
 Golden Quadrilateral, a network of highways in India
 Quadrilateral Security Dialogue, a strategic alliance of the United States, Japan, Australia and India within Asia.
 Quadrilateral Treaty, a pact between the Argentine provinces of Buenos Aires, Santa Fe, Entre Ríos and Corrientes, signed on 25 January 1822.
 Quadrilatero, in the Revolutions of 1848, in the Italian states - an area within the group of fortresses at Mantua, Verona, Peschiera and Legnago
 Quadrilateral (horse), thoroughbred racehorse
 "Quadrilateral", an alternative name for Southern Dobruja mostly used by Romanians

See also
 Quadriliteral
 Quadrangle (geography)